Horologium may refer to:

 Horologium (constellation)
 Astronomical clock or horologium
 Horologium augusti or Solarium Augusti, a sun marker built by Augustus
 Horologium Oscillatorium, a 17th-century book by Christiaan Huygens
 Horologium Supercluster
 Horologium, a turret clock built in 1283 in Dunstable, UK
 Horologium Sapientiae, a 14th-century book on spirituality by Henry Suso

See also
 Book of hours, a Christian devotional book popular in the Middle Ages
 Horologion, manuscripts containing a daily schedule of prayers
 Horology, the science of time-keeping